Des Pardes is a 1978 Hindi drama film, produced and directed by Dev Anand. This family drama stars Dev Anand and Tina Munim (in her debut film), with Ajit Khan, Pran, Amjad Khan, Shreeram Lagoo, Tom Alter, Bindu, Prem Chopra, A. K. Hangal, Sujit Kumar, Mehmood and Paintal in the supporting cast. For the first time, Dev Anand chose comparatively new music director Rajesh Roshan for this film, who did full justice to his selection as most of the songs became quite popular. The film received a Filmfare award for its sets and also received a nomination for best music director. Upon release, the film was an average success. However, over the years, it has garnered a cult following and is regarded as a classic. 

The message of this film is about the trend with some people, at the time, to earn money from foreign lands and that innocent ones being trapped and tormented by the illicit operators.

Plot 
Samir Sahni is a farmer living with his mom, dad, wife, Rama, a young daughter, and his younger brother, Veer. Samir gets an offer to work in the U.K., and departs accordingly. He would like to settle there, and after doing so, would like his family to also join him. The years go by, and Samir keeps in touch with his family regularly. Then the Sahni family stop receiving any letters from him, and are anxious to know what has happened to him. Veer is asked to travel to U.K. to find out, and he does so. What he finds are tens of thousands of East Indians on fake passports, working for less than minimum wages, poor unhealthy conditions, fear of being deported, and paying half of their earnings to fellow East Indians who had got them here through the underground. Veer finds no sign of his brother, and sets out to investigate, only to find deceit, murder, and that his very own life in danger.

Cast
Dev Anand as Veer Sahni
Tina Munim as Gauri
Pran as Samir Sahni
Gajanan Jagirdar as Mr. Sahni
Indrani Mukherjee as Rama Sahni
Ajit Khan as Gurnam
Tom Alter as Inspector Martin
Bindu as Sylvia
Prem Chopra as Bansilal
A. K. Hangal as Pujari
Jankidas as Daiyal
Bharat Kapoor as Murarilal
Amjad Khan as Boota Singh / Avtar Singh
Sujit Kumar as Gangaram
Shreeram Lagoo as Mr. Burns
Mehmood as Anwar
Keith Stevenson as A. Tupper
Birbal as Announcer
Sudhir as Kashyap
Paintal
Gufi Paintal
Sharat Saxena
Prem Sagar
Raj Mehra
Yusuf Khan

Crew
Writer - Dev Anand, Suraj Sanim
Producer - Dev Anand, Amit Khanna
Production Company - Navketan International Films, Navketan
Cinematographer - Fali Mistry, D. K. Prabhakar
Music Director - Rajesh Roshan
Lyricist - Amit Khanna
Playback Singers - Kishore Kumar, Lata Mangeshkar, Amit Kumar, Manhar Udhas, Vijay Benedict,

Soundtrack
All the songs are composed by Rajesh Roshan, with lyrics by Amit Khanna.

Song "Tu Pee Aur Jee" was listed at #9 on Binaca Geetmala annual list 1978
Song "Aap Kahen Aur Ham Na Aaye" was listed at #13 on Binaca Geetmala annual list 1978
 Song "Jaisa Des Waisa Bhes" was listed at #22 on Binaca Geetmala annual list 1978

References

External links 
 
 Des pardes music

1978 films
1970s Hindi-language films
Films directed by Dev Anand
Films scored by Rajesh Roshan